Mizilo Gara is a town and commune in Madagascar. It belongs to the district of Manakara, which is a part of Vatovavy-Fitovinany Region. The population of the commune was estimated to be approximately 8,000 in 2001 commune census.

Only primary schooling is available. The majority 94% of the population of the commune are farmers.  The most important crops are cassava and lychee, while other important agricultural products are sugarcane and rice. Industry and services provide employment for 5% and 1% of the population, respectively.

It lies at the Fianarantsoa-Côte Est railway and the RN 12 that links the town with Fianarantsoa and Manakara

References and notes 

Populated places in Vatovavy-Fitovinany